Chowdhury Mohammad Azizul Haque Hazary OSP, SGP, ndc, psc, MPhilis a major general of Bangladesh Army and General Officer Commanding (GOC) of 17th Infantry Division, Jalalabad Cantonment & Area Commander, Sylhet Area, Sylhet.

Career 
In 2019, Hazary served as Sector Commander of Northern Sector of UN Peacekeeping Force in Democratic Republic of the Congo (MONUSCO). Before that, he served as the Area Commander of Bandarban region. On 14 November 2018, a 14-year-old boy died in a shootout between his troops and criminals.

General Hazary was commissioned with 22 BMA Long Course in June 1990 and he won the Sword of Honor for all round best performance in his course. Prior to join SI&T, General Hazary was serving at ARTDOC. He was promoted to Major General and made the commandant of the School of Infantry and Tactics on December 2020. On 12 November 2022, he is posted to 17th Infantry Division as General Officer Commanding (GOC) and Area Commander Sylhet Area.

References 

Living people
Bangladesh Army generals
1969 births